The 2019 French Open (officially known as the Yonex French Open 2019 for sponsorship reasons) was a badminton competition which took place at Stade Pierre de Coubertin in Paris, France, from 22 to 27 October 2019. It had a total purse of $750,000.

Tournament
The 2019 French Open was the twenty-first tournament of the 2019 BWF World Tour and also part of the French Open championships, which has been held since 1935. This tournament was organized by French Badminton Federation with the sanction of the BWF.

Venue
This international tournament was held at Stade Pierre de Coubertin in Paris, France.

Point distribution
Below is the point distribution table for each phase of the tournament based on the BWF points system for the BWF World Tour Super 750 event.

Prize money
The total prize money for this tournament was US$750,000. Distribution of prize money was in accordance with BWF regulations.

Men's singles

Seeds

 Kento Momota (quarter-finals)
 Chou Tien-chen (second round)
 Shi Yuqi (withdrew)
 Anders Antonsen (quarter-finals)
 Chen Long (champion)
 Jonatan Christie (final)
 Viktor Axelsen (semi-finals)
 Anthony Sinisuka Ginting (semi-finals)

Finals

Top half

Section 1

Section 2

Bottom half

Section 3

Section 4

Women's singles

Seeds

 Tai Tzu-ying (semi-finals)
 Akane Yamaguchi (semi-finals)
 Nozomi Okuhara (second round)
 Chen Yufei (withdrew)
 P. V. Sindhu (quarter-finals)
 Ratchanok Intanon (quarter-finals)
 He Bingjiao (quarter-finals)
 Saina Nehwal (quarter-finals)

Finals

Top half

Section 1

Section 2

Bottom half

Section 3

Section 4

Men's doubles

Seeds

 Marcus Fernaldi Gideon / Kevin Sanjaya Sukamuljo (champions)
 Mohammad Ahsan / Hendra Setiawan (second round)
 Li Junhui / Liu Yuchen (quarter-finals)
 Takeshi Kamura / Keigo Sonoda (quarter-finals)
 Hiroyuki Endo / Yuta Watanabe (semi-finals)
 Fajar Alfian / Muhammad Rian Ardianto (first round)
 Han Chengkai / Zhou Haodong (quarter-finals)
 Takuro Hoki / Yugo Kobayashi (first round)

Finals

Top half

Section 1

Section 2

Bottom half

Section 3

Section 4

Women's doubles

Seeds

 Mayu Matsumoto / Wakana Nagahara (semi-finals)
 Yuki Fukushima / Sayaka Hirota (semi-finals)
 Misaki Matsutomo / Ayaka Takahashi (second round)
 Chen Qingchen / Jia Yifan (quarter-finals)
 Lee So-hee / Shin Seung-chan (champions)
 Greysia Polii / Apriyani Rahayu (second round)
 Du Yue / Li Yinhui (withdrew)
 Kim So-yeong / Kong Hee-yong (final)

Finals

Top half

Section 1

Section 2

Bottom half

Section 3

Section 4

Mixed doubles

Seeds

 Zheng Siwei / Huang Yaqiong (final)
 Dechapol Puavaranukroh / Sapsiree Taerattanachai (quarter-finals)
 Yuta Watanabe / Arisa Higashino (semi-finals)
 Seo Seung-jae / Chae Yoo-jung (second round)
 Chan Peng Soon / Goh Liu Ying (first round)
 Praveen Jordan / Melati Daeva Oktavianti (champions)
 Marcus Ellis / Lauren Smith (first round)
 Hafiz Faizal / Gloria Emanuelle Widjaja (second round)

Finals

Top half

Section 1

Section 2

Bottom half

Section 3

Section 4

References

External links
 Official Website
 Tournament Link

French Open (badminton)
French Open (badminton)
French Open (badminton)
French Open (badminton)